The Newton Jordan House is a property in Triune, Tennessee, United States, that was listed on the National Register of Historic Places in 1988. It was built, remodelled, or has other significance in c. 1830 and c. 1900. It includes Central passage plan and other architecture.

William Jordan was an early settler of the Triune area.  He and Hartwell Hyde arrived in 1810.  Jordan's log home is the location of the Newton Jordan House.  The Hartwell B. Hyde House also survives and is NRHP-listed.  The property is also denoted as Williamson County historic resource WM-259.

Gallery

References

External links
Tennessee State archives photo 1 and photo 2

1830 establishments in Tennessee
Central-passage houses in Tennessee
Houses completed in 1830
Houses in Williamson County, Tennessee
Houses on the National Register of Historic Places in Tennessee
National Register of Historic Places in Williamson County, Tennessee